Greendale is a primarily agricultural settlement within Chilliwack, British Columbia, Canada, located  east of the City of Vancouver. Greendale is located on the west side of Chilliwack, bordering the east side of the City of Abbotsford. The Vedder River forms the border between Greendale and Yarrow which lies to the South. Greendale was originally called Sumas, but got renamed in 1951 to avoid confusion with the adjoining municipality, the District of Sumas (now part of the City of Abbotsford), as well as Sumas, Washington. The area was once a  lake at the base of Sumas Mountain. Sumas Lake was drained in the early 1920s. Greendale has experienced two major floods, after the completed drainage, in 1894 and 1948.

The Great Blue Heron Nature Reserve is located in Greendale.

References

External links
 Aerial photos of Greendale
 BC Geographical names
 Community of Villages

Neighbourhoods in Chilliwack
Lower Mainland